Southland may refer to:

Places

Canada
 Dunbar–Southlands, Vancouver, British Columbia

New Zealand
 Southland Region, a region of New Zealand
 Southland County, a former New Zealand county
 Southland District, part of the wider Southland Region
 Southland Plains

United States
 Chicago Southland
 Greater Los Angeles Area
 Southern United States
 Southland, Texas

Fictional places
 Southland (Shannara), a region in the fictional world of Terry Brooks' Shannara series
 The Southlands, a mythical location in the Warhammer universe
 The Southlands, a mythical location in the Middle-earth, in J. R. R. Tolkien's fantasy book series
 Southern California in the alternate universe of Southland Tales

Buildings
 Southland Astronomical Society Observatory, in Invercargill, New Zealand
 Southland Center, a former office building, now Sheraton Dallas Hotel in Dallas, Texas
 Southland Leisure Centre, in Calgary, Alberta
 Stadium Southland, Invercargill, New Zealand

Shopping centers
 Southland Center (Michigan), in Taylor, Michigan, a suburb of Detroit
 Southland Mall (Hayward, California)
 Southland Mall (Houma, Louisiana)
 Southland Mall (Memphis, Tennessee)
 Southland Mall (Miami), Florida
 Southlands (Aurora, Colorado)
 Westfield Southland, in Cheltenham, Victoria
 Marion Centre, formerly Southland Mall, in Marion, Ohio

In business and industry
 Southland Entertainment Group, an Alabama theme park company
 Southland Corporation, headquarters of 7-Eleven convenience stores
 Southland Casino Racing, casino and greyhound racetrack in Arkansas

Movies
 Southland Tales, a 2006 science fiction film
 Southlander, an American independent film

Music
 The Southland (band), from Los Angeles, California
 Southland Records, a United States record label
 The Southlanders, a British vocal group
Southland (jazz venue), a ballroom in Boston

Publications
 Southland (novel), by Nina Revoyr
 The Southland Times, a newspaper in New Zealand

Television
 Southland TV, former name of Cue TV, a television station in New Zealand
 Southland (TV series), a drama set in Los Angeles, California

Educational institutes
In Canada
Southlands Elementary School, Vancouver, British Columbia
In New Zealand
Northern Southland College, Lumsden, Southland Region
Southland Polytechnic (Southern Institute of Technology), Invercargill, Southland
In The Philippines
Southland College, in Kabankalan City, Negros Occidental
In Sri Lanka
Southlands College, Galle
In the United Kingdom
Southlands College, Roehampton, a Methodist college in England
In the United States
Southland Academy, Americus, Georgia
Southland Independent School District, Southland, Texas
Southland School District, Mower county, Minnesota
Southland College Preparatory Charter High School, Richton Park, Illinois

Sports
 Southern Steel, a netball team in New Zealand
 Southland Conference, an NCAA Division 1 sports conference
 Southland Sharks, a basketball team in New Zealand
 Southland Rugby Football Union, a rugby union team in New Zealand

Transportation
 HMT Southland (1900), a Belgium tramp steamer
 Southland station (Calgary), a stop on the South Line of the C-Train light rail system in Calgary, Alberta
 Southland railway station, a train station in Cheltenham, Victoria, Australia
 Southland (train), a former passenger train in the United States
 Southland Transportation, a brand of Pacific Western Transportation